Switala or Świtała, sometimes respelled Switalla, Schwitalla, or Schwitalle, is a surname. Notable people with the surname include:

 Carole Switala (1946–2016), American puppeteer, singer and voice actor
 Kazimierz Świtała (1923–2011), Polish politician and interior minister
 Max Schwitalla (born 2000), German footballer
 Karl Schwitalle (1906–1945), German weightlifter
 Marcos Switala MSc (born 1983), Brazilian automotive Mechanical Engineer, notable contribution to the global mobility industry

See also
 

Polish-language surnames